Myloplus lobatus is a medium to large omnivorous fish of the family Serrasalmidae from South America, where found in the Amazon and Orinoco River basins.

References

Jégu, M., 2003. Serrasalminae (Pacus and piranhas). p. 182-196. In R.E. Reis, S.O. Kullander and C.J. Ferraris, Jr. (eds.) Checklist of the Freshwater Fishes of South and Central America. Porto Alegre: EDIPUCRS, Brasil.

Serrasalmidae
Fish of the Amazon basin
Taxa named by Achille Valenciennes
Fish described in 1850